The Virginia Biotechnology Association (VABIO) is the statewide trade group that promotes the scientific and economic impact of the biotechnology industry in the Commonwealth of Virginia.

Headquartered at the Virginia BioTechnology Research Park in Richmond, Virginia, VABIO was founded in 1992, and incorporated in the Commonwealth of Virginia as a non-profit 501(c)(6) trade association. It is the official state affiliate of the Biotechnology Industry Organization (BIO).

VABIO sponsors student internships, workforce development initiatives and serves as the primary contact point for the media, government officials, researchers and students regarding the bioscience industry in Virginia. Its activities are governed by a board of directors composed of twenty-four leaders representing all segments of the bioscience community. The first full-time executive director for VABIO, Mark A. Herzog, was hired in August 2000. The current CEO is John L. Newby II.

The Virginia Biotechnology Association is one of the three founding partners of Mid-Atlantic Bio, the first regional bioscience convention that combines academia, the commercial bioscience industry, and the venture capital community in one major event.

VABIO also produces the Virginia Bioscience Blog and the Virginia Bioscience Podcast.

References

External links

Virginia BioTechnology Research Park
Biotechnology Industry Organization
Mid-Atlantic Bio
Virginia Bioscience Blog
Virginia Bioscience Podcast

Biotechnology advocacy

Advocacy groups in the United States
Organizations established in 1992
1992 establishments in Virginia
Trade associations based in the United States
501(c)(6) nonprofit organizations